The Mali Empire (Manding: Mandé or Manden) was an empire in West Africa from  1226 to 1670. The empire was founded by Sundiata Keita (c. 1214 – c. 1255) and became renowned for the wealth of its rulers, especially Mansa Musa (Musa Keita). The Manding languages were spoken in the empire. At its peak, Mali was the largest empire in West Africa, widely influencing the culture of the region through the spread of its language, laws and customs. Much of the recorded information about the Mali Empire comes from 14th-century Tunisian historian Ibn Khaldun, 14th-century Moroccan traveller Ibn Battuta and 16th-century Andalusian traveller Leo Africanus. The other major source of information comes from Mandinka oral tradition, as recorded by storytellers known as griots.

The empire began as a small Mandinka kingdom at the upper reaches of the Niger River, centered around the Manding region. During the 11th and 12th centuries, an empire began to develop following the decline of the Ghana Empire, or Wagadu, to the north. During this period, trade routes shifted southward to the savanna, stimulating the growth of states such as Bono state. The early history of the Mali Empire (before the 13th century) is unclear, as there are conflicting and imprecise accounts by both Arab chroniclers and oral traditionalists. Sundiata Keita is the first ruler for which there is accurate written information (through Ibn Khaldun). Sundiata Keita was a warrior-prince of the Keita dynasty who was called upon to free the local people from the rule of the king of the Sosso Empire, Soumaoro Kanté. The conquest of Sosso in c. 1235 gave the Mali Empire access to the trans-Saharan trade routes.

Following the death of Sundiata Keita in c. 1255, the kings of Mali were referred to by the title mansa. In c. 1285 Sakoura, a former royal court slave, became emperor and was one of Mali's most powerful rulers, greatly expanding the empire's territory. He made a pilgrimage to Mecca during the reign of Mamluk Sultan An-Nasir Muhammad (r. 1298–1308), but died on his voyage home. After the reigns of two more emperors, Musa Keita became mansa in c. 1312. He made a famous pilgrimage to Mecca from 1324 to 1326. His generous gifts to Mamluk Egypt and his expenditure of gold caused significant inflation in Egypt. Maghan I succeeded his father as mansa in 1337, but was deposed by his uncle Suleyman in 1341. It was during Suleyman's 19-year reign that Ibn Battuta visited Mali. Suleyman's death marked the end of Mali's Golden Age and the beginning of a slow decline.

It is known from the Tarikh al-Sudan that Mali was still a sizeable state in the 15th century. The Venetian explorer Alvise Cadamosto and Portuguese traders confirmed that the peoples of the Gambia were still subject to the mansa of Mali. Upon Leo Africanus's visit at the beginning of the 16th century, his descriptions of the territorial domains of Mali showed that it was still a kingdom of considerable size. However, from 1507 onwards neighboring states such as Diara, Great Fulo and the Songhai Empire chipped away at the outer borders of Mali. In 1542, the Songhai invaded the capital city but were unsuccessful in conquering the empire. During the 17th century, the Mali Empire faced incursions from the Bamana Empire. After unsuccessful attempts by Mansa Mama Maghan to conquer Bamana, the Bamana in 1670 sacked and burned the capital, and the Mali Empire rapidly disintegrated and ceased to exist, being replaced by independent chiefdoms. The Keitas retreated to the town of Kangaba, where they became provincial chiefs.

Name

Mali, Mandé, Manden, and Manding are all various pronunciations of the same word across different languages and dialects. The version recorded by medieval Arab geographers is Mali. Mali is the Fula form of the word. In the Manding languages, the modern descendants of the language spoken at the core of the Mali Empire, Manden or Manding is the name of the region corresponding to the heartland of the Mali Empire.

Medieval sources are divided over whether Mali is the name of a town or a region. Ibn Battuta who visited the capital city from 1352 to 1353, called it Mali. The 1375 Catalan Atlas portrayed a "city of Melly" in West Africa. Leo Africanus said that the capital city was called Melli. However, Ibn Fadlallah al-Umari gives Mali as the name of the capital province and Ibn Khaldun refers to Mali as a people, with each giving different names for the capital city itself. Whether Mali originated as the name of a town or region, the name was subsequently applied to the entire empire ruled from Mali.

Another hypothesis suggests that the name Mali is derived from Mandé mali "hippopotamus", an animal that had special significance to the Keitas, and that Mandé means "little manatee". A legend claims that Sunjata transformed into a hippopotamus. However, these hypotheses have been rejected by locals and are inconsistent with the apparent cognate status of Mali and Mandé.

Historiography

Imperial Mali is best known through three primary sources: the first is the account of Shihab al-'Umari, written in about 1340 by a geographer-administrator in Mamluk Egypt. His information about the empire came from visiting Malians taking the hajj, or pilgrim's voyage to Mecca. He had first-hand information from several sources, and from a second-hand source, he learned of the visit of Mansa Musa. The second account is that of the traveller Ibn Battuta, who visited Mali in 1352. This is the first account of a West African kingdom made directly by an eyewitness; the others are usually second-hand. The third great account is that of Ibn Khaldun, who wrote in the early 15th century. While the accounts are of limited length, they provide a fairly good picture of the empire at its height.

After Ibn Khaldun's death in 1406, there are no further Arab primary sources except for Leo Africanus, who wrote over a century later. Arab interest in the Mali Empire declined after the Songhai conquered the northern regions of the empire which formed the primary contact between Mali and the Arab world. For the later period of the Mali Empire, the major written primary sources are Portuguese accounts of the coastal provinces of Mali and neighboring societies.

Geography

The Mali Empire began in and was centered around the Manding region in what is now southern Mali and northeastern Guinea.

Territory

The Mali Empire reached its largest area under the Laye Keita mansas. Al-Umari, who wrote down a description of Mali based on information given to him by Abu Sa’id 'Otman ed Dukkali (who had lived 35 years in the capital), reported the realm as being square and an eight-month journey from its coast at Tura (at the mouth of the Senegal River) to Muli. Umari also describes the empire as being south of Marrakesh and almost entirely inhabited except for few places. Mali's domain also extended into the desert. He describes it as being north of Mali but under its domination implying some sort of vassalage for the Antasar, Yantar'ras, Medussa and Lemtuna Berber tribes. The empire's total area included nearly all the land between the Sahara Desert and coastal forests. It spanned the modern-day countries of Senegal, southern Mauritania, Mali, northern Burkina Faso, western Niger, the Gambia, Guinea-Bissau, Guinea, the Ivory Coast and northern Ghana. The empire also reached its highest population during the Laye period ruling over 400 cities, towns and villages of various religions and elasticities. During this period only the Mongol Empire was larger.

Al-ʿUmari reported that Mali had fourteen provinces. His list does not necessarily accurately reflect the actual organization of the Mali Empire, and the identification of the listed provinces is controversial. Several of the names are spelled in a variety of ways in different manuscripts. Al-ʿUmari's list, which is quoted with slight differences by al-Qalqashandi, is as follows:

Ghana: Corresponds to the former Ghana Empire.
Zafun: Diafunu
Tirafka: Probably the same as Tiraqqa, a town on the Niger between Timbuktu and Gao mentioned by several other sources.
Takrur: On 3rd cataract of the Senegal River, north of Jolof. By the 14th century, the term Takrur had become commonly misused by Arab writers.
Sanghana: A region surrounding the mouth of the Senegal river. The name of the river may be derived from the name Sanghana.
 or : Possibly the Bambuk region, between the Senegal and Faleme rivers, which was a major source of gold, but identification is uncertain.
Zarqatabana
Damura
Zagha: Dia. Ruled by a sultan who was a vassal of the Mansa of Mali.
Kabura: Along the Niger upstream of Zagha. Like Zagha, ruled by a sultan who was a vassal of the Mansa of Mali. Identified with Diafarabé by Delafosse and Kaara (south of the Niger, opposite Kokry) by Bazin. Also spelled Kabara or Kabira; not to be confused with Kabara, Timbuktu's port on the Niger.
Bawaghuri: Possibly Zagra, ten days' travel south of Walata.
Kawkaw: The city of Gao, which was called Kawkaw by medieval Arabic sources. Formerly an independent kingdom, it was annexed into the Mali Empire by either Mansa Sakura or Mansa Musa. It would later become the capital of the Songhai Empire.
Mali: The capital province, for which the empire gets its name. Al-'Umari reports that the capital itself, located in the province of Mali, was called .

Al-ʿUmari also indicates that four Amazigh tribes were subjects of Mali:

Yantaṣar or Kel Antasar: Located in the vicinity of the Adrar des Ifoghas.
Tīn Gharās or Yantar'ras: Correspond to the modern Kel Gres. Located in the vicinity of Tadmekka in medieval times.
Madūsa: Members of the Sanhaja confederation located on the Niger between Ghana and Tadmekka.
Lamtūna: Members of the Sanhaja confederation in the vicinity of the Adrar Plateau and Tagant Plateau.

Gomez instead suggests that these tribes would have inhabited territory in the vicinity of Mema, Ghana, and Diafunu.

Capital debate
The identity of the capital city of the Mali Empire is a matter of dispute among historians. Scholars have located the capital in Niani, or somewhere on the Niger, or proposed that it changed several times, that there was no true capital, or even that it lay as far afield as the upper Gambia River in modern-day Senegal. Seemingly contradictory reports written by Arab visitors, a lack of definitive archaeological evidence, and the diversity of oral traditions all contribute to this uncertainty. A particular challenge lies in interpreting early Arabic manuscripts, in which, without vowel markings and diacritics, foreign names can be read in numerous different ways (e.g. Biti, Buti, Yiti, Tati). Ibn Battuta and Leo Africanus both call the capital "Mali."

Early European writers such as Maurice Delafosse believed that Niani, a city on what is now the border between Guinea and Mali, was the capital for most of the empire's history, and this notion has taken hold in the popular imagination. Djibril Tamsir Niane, a Guinean historian, has been a forceful advocate of this position in recent decades. The identification of Niani as imperial capital is rooted in an (possibly erroneous) interpretation of the Arab traveler al Umari's work, as well as some oral histories. Extensive archaeological digs have shown that the area was an important trade and manufacturing center in the 15th century, but no firm evidence of royal residence has come to light. Niani's reputation as an imperial capital may derive from its importance in the late imperial period, when the Songhai Empire to the northeast pushed Mali back to the Manding heartland. Several 21st century historians have firmly rejected Niani as a capital candidate based on a lack of archaeological evidence of significant trade activity, clearly described by Arab visitors, particularly during the 14th century, Mali's golden age. In fact, there is a conspicuous absence of archaeological samples of any kind from Niani dated to the late 13th through early 15th centuries, suggesting that Niani may have been uninhabited during the heyday of the Mali Empire.

Various sources cite several other cities as capitals of the Mali Empire, some in competition with the Niani hypothesis and others addressing different time periods. A city called Dieriba or Dioliba is sometimes mentioned as the capital or main urban center of the province of Mande in the years before Sundiata, that was later abandoned.

Many oral histories point to a town called Dakajalan as the original home of the Keita clan and Sundiata's childhood home and base of operations during the war against the Soso. It may have been located close to modern Kangaba. Mande bards in the region speak of the Dakajalan site, containing Sundiata's grave, as sacrosanct. Kangaba became the last refuge of the Keita royal family after the collapse of the Mali Empire, and so has for centuries been associated with Sundiata in the cultural imagination of Mande peoples. If Dakajalan was, in fact, situated near Kangaba, this may also have contributed to their conflation, beginning with Delafosse's speculation that the latter may have begun as a suburb of the former.

According to Jules Vidal and Levtzion, citing oral histories from Kangaba and Keyla, another onetime capital was Manikoro or Mali-Kura, founded after the destruction of Niani.

Parallel to this debate, many scholars have argued that the Mali Empire may not have had a permanent "capital" in the sense that the word is used today, and historically was used in the Mediterranean world. Rather, authority would rest with the mansa and his court, wherever he went. Therefore,  Arabic visitors may have assigned the "capital" label merely to whatever major city the mansa was based out of at the time of their visit. It has been suggested that the name given in the Arabic sources for the capital of Mali is derived the Manding word "bambi", meaning "dais", and as such refers to the "seat of government" in general rather than being the name of a specific city. Such impermanent capitals are a historically widespread phenomenon, having occurred in other parts of Africa such as Ethiopia, as well as outside Africa, such as in the Holy Roman Empire.

History

Pre-imperial Mali

The Rock art in the Sahara suggests that northern Mali has been inhabited since 10,000 BC, when the Sahara was fertile and rich in wildlife. In the first millennium BC, early cities and towns were created by Mande peoples related to the Soninke people, along the middle Niger River in central Mali, including at Dia which began from around 900 BC, and reached its peak around 600 BC, and Djenne-Djenno, which lasted from around 250 BC to 900 AD. By the 6th century AD, the lucrative trans-Saharan trade in gold, salt and slaves had begun, facilitating the rise of West Africa's great empires.

There are a few references to Mali in early Islamic literature. Among these are references to "Pene" and "Malal" in the work of al-Bakri in 1068, the story of the conversion of an early ruler, known to Ibn Khaldun (by 1397) as Barmandana, and a few geographical details in the work of al-Idrisi.

In the 1960s, archaeological work at Niani village, reputed to be the capital of the Mali Empire, by Polish and Guinean archaeologists revealed the remains of a substantial town dating back as far as the 6th century.

Modern oral traditions also related that the Mandinka kingdoms of Mali or Manden had already existed several centuries before Sundiata's unification as a small state just to the south of the Soninké empire of Wagadou, better known as the Ghana Empire. This area was composed of mountains, savannah and forest providing ideal protection and resources for the population of hunters. Those not living in the mountains formed small city-states such as Toron, Ka-Ba and Niani. Through the oral tradition of griots, the Keita dynasty, from which nearly every Mali emperor came, claims to trace its lineage back to Lawalo, one of the sons of Bilal, the faithful muezzin of Islam's prophet Muhammad, who was said to have migrated into Mali and his descendants established the ruling Keita dynasty through Maghan Kon Fatta, father of Sundiata Keita.

It was common practice during the Middle Ages for both Christian and Muslim rulers to tie their bloodline back to a pivotal figure in their faith's history, so the lineage of the Keita dynasty may be dubious at best, yet African Muslim scholars like the London-based Nigerian-British cleric Sheikh Abu-Abdullah Adelabu have laid claim of divine attainments to the reign of Mansa Mousa: "in Islamic history and its science stories of Old Mali Empire and significance of Mansa Mousa by ancient Muslim historians like Shihab al-Umari, documenting histories of African legendaries like Mansa Kankan Musa did actually exist in early Arabic sources about West African history including works of the author of Subh al-a 'sha one of the final expressions of the genre of Arabic administrative literature, Ahmad al-Qalqashandi Egyptian writer, mathematician and scribe of the scroll (katib al-darj) in the Mamluk chancery in Cairo as well as by the author of Kitab al-Masalik wa al-Mamalik (Book of Highways and Kingdoms) Abū ʿUbayd Al-Bakri, an Arab Andalusian Muslim geographer and historian emboldened Keita Dynasty", wrote Adelabu.

In his attempt to justify the importance of the Keita and their civilisation in early Arabic literatures, Adelabu, the head of Awqaf Africa in London, coined the Arabic derivatives ك – و – ي K(a)-W(e)-Y(a) of the word Keita which in (in what he called) Arabicised Mandingo language Allah(u) Ka(w)eia meaning "Allah Creates All" as a favourable motto of reflection for Bilal Ibn Rabah, one of the most trusted and loyal Sahabah (companions) of the Islamic prophet Muhammad, whom he described (quoting William Muir's book The Life of Muhammad) as 'a tall, dark, and with African feature and bushy hair' pious man who overcame slavery, racism and socio-political obstacles in Arabia to achieve a lofty status in this world and in the Hereafter.

The Manding Region
The history of the Mandinka started in Manding region. This region straddles the border between what is now southern Mali and northeastern Guinea. Hunters from the Ghana Empire (or Wagadou), particularly mythical ancestors Kontron and Sanin, founded Manding and the Malinké and Bambaras hunter brotherhood. The area was famous as a hunting ground for the large amount of game that it sheltered, as well as its dense vegetation. The Camara (or Kamara) are said to be the first family to have lived in Manding, after having left, due to the drought, Ouallata, a region of Wagadou, in the south-east of present-day Mauritania. They founded the first village of the Manding, Kirikoroni, then Kirina, Siby, Kita. A very large number of families that make up the Mandinka community were born in Manding.

The Kangaba province

During the height of Sundiata's power, the land of Manden (the area populated by the Mandinka people) became one of its provinces. The Manden city-state of Ka-ba (present-day Kangaba) served as the capital and name of this province. From at least the beginning of the 11th century, Mandinka kings known as faamas ruled Manden from Ka-ba in the name of the Ghanas.

The two kingdoms
Wagadou's control over Manden came to a halt after internal instability lead to its decline. The Kangaba province, free of Soninké influence, splintered into twelve kingdoms with their own maghan (meaning prince) or faama. Manden was split in half with the Dodougou territory to the northeast and the Kri territory to the southwest. The tiny kingdom of Niani was one of several in the Kri area of Manden.

The Kaniaga rulers
In approximately 1140 the Sosso kingdom of Kaniaga, a former vassal of Wagadou, began conquering the lands of its old rulers. By 1180 it had even subjugated Wagadou forcing the Soninké to pay tribute. In 1203, the Sosso king Soumaoro of the Kanté clan came to power and reportedly terrorised much of Manden stealing women and goods from both Dodougou and Kri.

The Hungering Lion

According to Niane's version of the epic, during the rise of Kaniaga, Sundiata of the Keita clan was born in the early 13th century. He was the son of Niani's faama, Nare Fa (also known as Maghan Kon Fatta meaning the handsome prince). Sundiata's mother was Maghan Kon Fatta's second wife, Sogolon Kédjou. She was a hunchback from the land of Do, south of Mali. The child of this marriage received the first name of his mother (Sogolon) and the surname of his father (Djata). Combined in the rapidly spoken language of the Mandinka, the names formed Sondjata, Sundjata or Sundiata Keita. The anglicised version of this name, Sunjata, is also popular. In Ibn Khaldun's account, Sundjata is recorded as Mari Djata with "Mari" meaning "Amir" or "Prince". He also states that Djata or "Jatah" means "lion".

Prince Sundjata was prophesied to become a great conqueror. To his parents' dread, the prince did not have a promising start. Sundiata, according to the oral traditions, did not walk until he was seven years old. However, once Sundiata did gain use of his legs he grew strong and very respected. Sadly for Sundjata, this did not occur before his father died. Despite the faama of Niani's wishes to respect the prophecy and put Sundiata on the throne, the son from his first wife Sassouma Bérété was crowned instead. As soon as Sassouma's son Dankaran Touman took the throne, he and his mother forced the increasingly popular Sundjata into exile along with his mother and two sisters. Before Dankaran Touman and his mother could enjoy their unimpeded power, King Soumaoro set his sights on Niani forcing Dankaran to flee to Kissidougou.

After many years in exile, first at the court of Wagadou and then at Mema, Sundiata was sought out by a Niani delegation and begged to combat the Sosso and free the kingdoms of Manden forever.

Battle of Kirina

Returning with the combined armies of Mema, Wagadou and all the rebellious Mandinka city-states, Maghan Sundiata led a revolt against the Kaniaga Kingdom around 1234. The combined forces of northern and southern Manden defeated the Sosso army at the Battle of Kirina (then known as Krina) in approximately 1235. This victory resulted in the fall of the Kaniaga kingdom and the rise of the Mali Empire. After the victory, King Soumaoro disappeared, and the Mandinka stormed the last of the Sosso cities. Maghan Sundiata was declared "faama of faamas" and received the title "mansa", which translates as "king". At the age of 18, he gained authority over all the 12 kingdoms in an alliance that would become the Mali Empire. He was crowned under the throne name Sunidata Keita becoming the first Mandinka emperor. And so the name Keita became a clan/family and began its reign.

Mari Djata I/Sundiata Keita I 
Mansa Mari Djata, later named Sundiata Keita, saw the conquest of several key locals in the Mali Empire. He never took the field again after Kirina, but his generals continued to expand the frontier, especially in the west where they reached the Gambia River and the marches of Tekrur. This enabled him to rule over a realm larger than even the Ghana Empire in its apex. After unifying Manden, he added the Wangara goldfields, making them the southern border. The northern commercial towns of Oualata and Audaghost were also conquered and became part of the new state's northern border. Wagadou and Mema became junior partners in the realm and part of the imperial nucleus. The lands of Bambougou, Jalo (Fouta Djallon), and Kaabu were added into Mali by Fakoli Koroma (Nkrumah in Ghana, Kurumah in the Gambia, Colley in Casamance, Senegal), Fran Kamara (Camara) and Tiramakhan Traore (Tarawelley in the Gambia), respectively Among the many different ethnic groups surrounding Manden were Pulaar speaking groups in Macina, Tekrur and Fouta Djallon.

Imperial Mali

Different oral traditions conflict with each other, as well as Ibn Khaldun, about the transfer of power following Sunjata's death. There was evidently a power struggle of some kind involving the gbara or great council and donson ton or hunter guilds. In the interregnum following Sunjata's death, the jomba or court slaves may have held power. Some oral traditions agree with Ibn Khaldun in indicating that a son of Sunjata, named Yerelinkon in oral tradition and Wali in Arabic, took power as Sunjata's successor. Ibn Khaldun regarded Wali as one of Mali's greatest rulers. He went on the hajj during the reign of Mamluk sultan Baibars (1260–1277). Wali was succeeded by his brother Wati, about whom nothing is known, and then his brother Khalifa. Khalifa would shoot arrows at his subjects, so he was overthrown and killed. He was replaced by Abu Bakr, a son of Sunjata's daughter. Abu Bakr was the first and only mansa to inherit through the female line, which has been argued to be either a break from or a return to tradition. Then an enslaved court official, Sakura, seized power. Sakura was able to stabilize the political situation in Mali. Under his leadership, Mali conquered new territories and trade with North Africa increased. He went on the hajj during the reign of Mamluk sultan an-Nasir Muhammad (1298–1308) and was killed in Tajura on his way back to Mali. After Sakura's death, power returned to the line of Sunjata, with Wali's son Qu taking the throne. Qu was succeeded by his son Muhammad, who launched two voyages to explore the Atlantic Ocean. After the loss of the first expedition, Muhammad led the second expedition himself. He left Kanku Musa, a grandson of Sunjata's brother Mande Bori, in charge during his absence. Eventually, due to Muhammad's failure to return, Musa was recognized as mansa.

Musa Keita I (Mansa Musa) 

Kankan Musa, better known as Mansa Musa probably took power in approximately 1312, although an earlier date is possible. His reign is considered the golden age of Mali. He was one of the first truly devout Muslims to lead the Mali Empire. He attempted to make Islam the faith of the nobility, but kept to the imperial tradition of not forcing it on the populace. He also made Eid celebrations at the end of Ramadan a national ceremony. He could read and write Arabic and took an interest in the scholarly city of Timbuktu, which he peaceably annexed in 1324. Via one of the royal ladies of his court, Musa transformed Sankore from an informal madrasah into an Islamic university. Islamic studies flourished thereafter.

Mansa Musa Keita's crowning achievement was his famous pilgrimage to Mecca, which started in 1324 and concluded with his return in 1326. Accounts of how many people and how much gold he spent vary. All of them agree that he took a very large group of people; the mansa kept a personal guard of some 500 men, and he gave out so many alms and bought so many things that the value of gold in Egypt and Arabia depreciated for twelve years. When he passed through Cairo, historian al-Maqrizi noted "the members of his entourage proceeded to buy Turkish and Ethiopian slave girls, singing girls and garments, so that the rate of the gold dinar fell by six dirhams."

Another testimony from Ibn Khaldun describes the grand pilgrimage of Mansa Musa consisting of 12,000 slaves:

Contemporary sources suggest that the mounts employed by this caravan were one hundred elephants, which carried those loads of gold, and several hundred camels, carrying the food, supplies and weaponries which were brought to the rear.

Musa took out large loans from money lenders in Cairo before beginning his journey home. It is not known if this was an attempt to correct the depreciation of gold in the area due to his spending, or if he had simply run out of the funds needed for the return trip. Musa's hajj, and especially his gold, caught the attention of both the Islamic and Christian worlds. Consequently, the name of Mali and Timbuktu appeared on 14th century world maps.

While on the hajj, he met the Andalusian poet and architect es-Saheli. Mansa Musa brought the architect back to Mali to beautify some of the cities. But more reasoned analysis suggests that his role, if any, was quite limited. The architectural crafts in Granada had reached their zenith by the fourteenth century, and its extremely unlikely that a cultured and wealthy poet would have had anything more than a dilettante's knowledge of the intricacies of contemporary architectural practice. Mosques were built in Gao and Timbuktu along with impressive palaces also built in Timbuktu. By the time of his death in 1337, Mali had control over Taghazza, a salt-producing area in the north, which further strengthened its treasury.

That same year, after the Mandinka general known as Sagmandir put down yet another rebellion in Gao, Mansa Musa came to Gao and accepted the capitulation of the King of Ghana and his nobles.

By the end of Mansa Musa's reign, the Sankoré University had been converted into a fully staffed university with the largest collections of books in Africa since the Library of Alexandria. The Sankoré University was capable of housing 25,000 students and had one of the largest libraries in the world with roughly 1,000,000 manuscripts.

Mansa Musa Keita was succeeded by his son, Maghan Keita I, in 1337. Mansa Maghan Keita I spent wastefully and was the first lacklustre emperor since Khalifa Keita. But the Mali Empire built by his predecessors was too strong for even his misrule and it passed intact to Musa's brother, Souleyman Keita in 1341.

Souleyman Keita 
Mansa Souleyman Keita (or Suleiman) took steep measures to put Mali back into financial shape, thereby developing a reputation for miserliness.  It is during his reign that Fula raids on Takrur began. There was also a palace conspiracy to overthrow him hatched by the Qasa (the Manding term meaning Queen) Kassi and several army commanders. Mansa Souleyman's generals successfully fought off the military incursions, and the senior wife Kassi behind the plot was imprisoned.

The mansa also made a successful hajj, kept up correspondence with Morocco and Egypt and built an earthen platform at Kangaba called the Camanbolon where he held court with provincial governors and deposited the holy books he brought back from Hedjaz.

The only major setback to his reign was the loss of Mali's Dyolof province in Senegal. The Wolof populations of the area united into their own state known as the Jolof Empire in the 1350s. Still, when Ibn Battuta arrived at Mali in July 1352, he found a thriving civilisation on par with virtually anything in the Muslim or Christian world. Mansa Souleyman Keita died in 1360 and was succeeded by his son, Camba Keita.

Mari Djata Keita II 
After a mere nine months of rule, Mansa Camba Keita was deposed by one of Maghan Keita I's three sons. Konkodougou Kamissa Keita, named for the province he once governed, was crowned as Mansa Mari Djata Keita II in 1360. He ruled oppressively and nearly bankrupted Mali with his lavish spending. He did however, maintain contacts with Morocco, sending a giraffe to King Abu Hassan. Mansa Mari Djata Keita II became seriously ill in 1372, and power moved into the hands of his ministers until his death in 1374.

Musa Keita II 
The reign of Mari Djata Keita II was ruinous and left the empire in bad financial shape, but the empire itself passed intact to the dead emperor's brother. Mansa Fadima Musa Keita, or Mansa Musa Keita II, began the process of reversing his brother's excesses. He did not, however, hold the power of previous mansas because of the influence of his kankoro-sigui.

Kankoro-sigui Mari Djata, who had no relation to the Keita clan, essentially ran the empire in Musa Keita II's stead. Ibn Khaldun recorded that in 776 A.H or 1374/1375 AD he interviewed a Sijilmasan scholar named Muhammad b. Wasul who had lived in Gao and had been employed in its judiciary. The latter told Ibn Khaldun about devastating struggle over Gao between Mali imperial forces against Berber Tuareg forces from Takedda. The text of Ibn Khaldun says "Gao, at this time is devastated". It seems quite possible that an exodus of the inhabitants took place at this juncture and the importance of the city was not revived until the rise of the Songhai empire.

The Songhai settlement effectively shook off Mali's authority in 1375. Still, by the time of Mansa Musa Keita II's death in 1387, Mali was financially solvent and in control of all of its previous conquests short of Gao and Dyolof.

Maghan Keita II 
The last son of Maghan Keita I, Tenin Maghan Keita (also known as Kita Tenin Maghan Keita for the province he once governed) was crowned Mansa Maghan Keita II in 1387. Little is known of him except that he only reigned two years. He was deposed in 1389, marking the end of the Faga Laye Keita mansas.

The obscure lineages (1389–1545)
From 1389 onwards Mali gained a host of mansas of obscure origins. This is the least known period in Mali's imperial history. What is evident is that there is no steady lineage governing the empire. The other characteristic of this era is the gradual loss of its northern and eastern possessions to the rising Songhai Empire and the movement of the Mali's economic focus from the trans-Saharan trade routes to the burgeoning commerce along the coast.

Sandaki Keita 
Mansa Sandaki Keita, a descendant of kankoro-sigui Mari Djata Keita, deposed Maghan Keita II, becoming the first person without any Keita dynastic relation to officially rule Mali. Sandaki Keita should not however be taken to be this person's name but a title. Sandaki likely means High Counsellor or Supreme Counsellor, from san or sanon (meaning "high") and adegue (meaning counsellor). He would only reign a year before a descendant of Mansa Gao Keita removed him.

Mahmud Keita, possibly a grandchild or great-grandchild of Mansa Gao Keita, was crowned Mansa Maghan Keita III in 1390. During his reign, the Mossi emperor Bonga of Yatenga raided into Mali and plundered Macina. Emperor Bonga did not appear to hold the area, and it stayed within the Mali Empire after Maghan Keita III's death in 1400.

15th–16th centuries
In the early 15th century, Mali was still powerful enough to conquer and settle new areas. One of these was Dioma, an area south of Niani populated by Fula Wassoulounké. Two noble brothers from Niani, of unknown lineage, went to Dioma with an army and drove out the Fula Wassoulounké. The oldest brother, Sérébandjougou Keita, was crowned Mansa Foamed or Mansa Musa Keita III. His reign saw the first in a string of many great losses to Mali. In 1433–1434, the Mali Empire lost control of Timbuktu to the Tuareg, led by Akil 
Ag-Amalwal. Three years later, Oualata also fell into their hands.

Following Musa Keita III's death, his brother Gbèré Keita became emperor in the mid-15th century. Gbèré Keita was crowned Mansa Ouali Keita II and ruled during the period of Mali's contact with Portugal. In the 1450s, Portugal began sending raiding parties along the Gambian coast. The Gambia was still firmly in Mali's control, and these raiding expeditions met with disastrous fates before Portugal's Diogo Gomes began formal relations with Mali via its remaining Wolof subjects. Alvise Cadamosto, a Venetian explorer, recorded that the Mali Empire was the most powerful entity on the coast in 1454.

Despite their power in the west, Mali was losing the battle for supremacy in the north and northeast. The new Songhai Empire conquered Mema, one of Mali's oldest possessions, in 1465. It then seized Timbuktu from the Tuareg in 1468 under Sunni Ali Ber.

In 1477, the Yatenga emperor Nasséré made yet another Mossi raid into Macina, this time conquering it and the old province of BaGhana (Wagadou).

Mansa Mahmud Keita II came to the throne in 1481 during Mali's downward spiral. It is unknown from whom he descended; however, another emperor, Mansa Maghan Keita III, is sometimes cited as Mansa Mahmud Keita I. Still, throne names do not usually indicate blood relations. Mansa Mahmud Keita II's rule was characterised by more losses to Mali's old possessions and increased contact between Mali and Portuguese explorers along the coast. In 1481, Fula raids against Mali's Tekrur provinces began.

The growing trade in Mali's western provinces with Portugal witnessed the exchange of envoys between the two nations. Mansa Mahmud Keita II received the Portuguese envoys Pêro d'Évora and Gonçalo Enes in 1487. The mansa lost control of Jalo during this period. Meanwhile, Songhai seized the salt mines of Taghazza in 1493. That same year, Mahmud II sent another envoy to the Portuguese proposing alliance against the Fula. The Portuguese decided to stay out of the conflict and the talks concluded by 1495 without an alliance.

Songhai forces under the command of Askia Muhammad I defeated the Mali general Fati Quali Keita in 1502 and seized the province of Diafunu. In 1514, the Denianke dynasty was established in Tekrour. It wasn't long before the new kingdom of Great Fulo was warring against Mali's remaining provinces.

In 1534, Mahmud III, the grandson of Mahmud II, received another Portuguese envoy to the Mali court by the name of Pero Fernandes. This envoy from the Portuguese coastal port of Elmina arrived in response to the growing trade along the coast and Mali's now urgent request for military assistance against Songhai. Still, no help came from the envoy and further possessions of Mali were lost one by one. The date of Mahmud's death and identity of his immediate successor are not recorded, and there is a gap of 65 years before another mansa's identity is recorded.

In 1544 or 1545, a Songhai force led by kanfari Dawud, who would later succeed his brother Askia Ishaq as ruler of the Songhai Empire, sacked the capital of Mali and purportedly used the royal palace as a latrine. However, the Songhai do not maintain their hold on the Malian capital.

Mali's fortunes seem to have improved in the second half of the 16th century. Around 1550, Mali attacked Bighu in an effort to regain access to its gold. Songhai authority over Bendugu and Kala declined by 1571, and Mali may have been able to reassert some authority over them. The breakup of the Wolof Empire allowed Mali to reassert authority over some of its former subjects on the north bank of the Gambia, such as Wuli, by 1576.

The swan song of the Mali Empire came in 1599, under the reign of Mansa Mahmud IV. The Songhai Empire had fallen to the Saadi Sultanate of Morocco eight years earlier, and Mahmud sought to take advantage of their defeat by trying to capture Jenne. Mahmud sought support from several other rulers, including the governor of Kala, Bukar. Bukar professed his support, but believing Mahmud's situation to be hopeless, secretly went over to the Moroccans. The Malian and Moroccan armies fought at Jenne on 26 April, the last day of Ramadan, and the Moroccans were victorious thanks to their firearms and Bukar's support, but Mahmud was able to escape.

Collapse

It would be the Mandinka themselves that would cause the final destruction of the empire. Around 1610, Mahmud Keita IV died. Oral tradition states that he had three sons who fought over Manden's remains. No single Keita ever ruled Manden after Mahmud Keita IV's death, resulting in the end of the Mali Empire.

Manden divided
The old core of the empire was divided into three spheres of influence. Kangaba, the de facto capital of Manden since the time of the last emperor, became the capital of the northern sphere. The Joma area, governed from Siguiri, controlled the central region, which encompassed Niani. Hamana (or Amana), southwest of Joma, became the southern sphere, with its capital at Kouroussa in modern Guinea. Each ruler used the title of mansa, but their authority only extended as far as their own sphere of influence. Despite this disunity in the realm, the realm remained under Mandinka control into the mid-17th century. The three states warred with each other as much, if not more, than they did against outsiders, but rivalries generally stopped when faced with invasion. This trend would continue into colonial times against Tukulor enemies from the west.

The Bamana jihad
Then, in 1630, the Bamana of Djenné declared their version of holy war on all Muslim powers in present-day Mali. They targeted Moroccan pashas still in Timbuktu and the mansas of Manden. In 1645, the Bamana attacked Manden, seizing both banks of the Niger right up to Niani. This campaign gutted Manden and destroyed any hope of the three mansas cooperating to free their land. The only Mandinka power spared from the campaign was Kangaba.

Sack of Niani
Mama Maghan, mansa of Kangaba, campaigned against the Bamana in 1667 and laid siege to Segou–Koro for a reported three years. Segou, defended by Bitòn Coulibaly, successfully defended itself and Mama Maghan was forced to withdraw. Either as a counter-attack or simply the progression of pre-planned assaults against the remnants of Mali, the Bamana sacked and burned Niani in 1670. Their forces marched as far north as Kangaba, where the mansa was obliged to make a peace with them, promising not to attack downstream of Mali. The Bamana, likewise, vowed not to advance farther upstream than Niamina. Following this disastrous set of events, Mansa Mama Maghan abandoned the capital of Niani.

Government

Organization
As founded by Mari Djata, it was composed of the "three freely allied states" of Mali, Mema and Wagadou plus the Twelve Doors of Mali.

The Twelve Doors of Mali were a coalition of conquered or allied territories, mostly within Manden, with sworn allegiance to Sundiata and his descendants. Upon stabbing their spears into the ground before Sundiata's throne, each of the twelve kings relinquished their kingdom to the Keita dynasty. In return for their submission, they became "farbas", a combination of the Mandinka words "farin" and "ba" (great farin). Farin was a general term for northern commander at the time. These farbas would rule their old kingdoms in the name of the mansa with most of the authority they held prior to joining the empire.

The Great Assembly
The Gbara or Great Assembly would serve as the Mandinka deliberative body until the collapse of the empire in 1645. Its first meeting, at the famous Kouroukan Fouga (Division of the World), had 29 clan delegates presided over by a belen-tigui (master of ceremony). The final incarnation of the Gbara, according to the surviving traditions of northern Guinea, held 32 positions occupied by 28 clans.

Social, economic and governmental reformation
The Kouroukan Fouga also put in place social and economic reforms including prohibitions on the maltreatment of prisoners and slaves, installing documents between clans which clearly stated who could say what about whom. Also, Sundiata divided the lands amongst the people assuring everyone had a place in the empire and fixed exchange rates for common products

Administration

The Mali Empire covered a larger area for a longer period of time than any other West African state before or since. What made this possible was the decentralised nature of administration throughout the state. According to Burkinabé writer Joseph Ki-Zerbo, the farther a person travelled from Niani, the more decentralised the mansa's power became. Nevertheless, the mansa managed to keep tax money and nominal control over the area without agitating his subjects into revolt. At the local level (village, town and city), kun-tiguis elected a dougou-tigui (village-master) from a bloodline descended from that locality's semi-mythical founder. The county level administrators called kafo-tigui (county-master) were appointed by the governor of the province from within his own circle. Only at the state or province level was there any palpable interference from the central authority in Niani. Provinces picked their own governors via their own custom (election, inheritance, etc.). Regardless of their title in the province, they were recognised as dyamani-tigui (province-master) by the mansa. Dyamani-tiguis had to be approved by the mansa and were subject to his oversight. If the mansa didn't believe the dyamani-tigui was capable or trustworthy, a farba might be installed to oversee the province or administer it outright.

Farins and farbas

The Mali Empire expanded through conquest or annexation. In the event of conquest, farins took control of the area until a suitable native ruler could be found. After the loyalty or at least the capitulation of an area was assured, it was allowed to select its own dyamani-tigui. This process was essential to keep non-Manding subjects loyal to the Manding elites that ruled them.

Barring any other difficulties, the dyamani-tigui would run the province by himself collecting taxes and procuring armies from the tribes under his command. However, territories that were crucial to trade or subject to revolt would receive a farba. Farbas were picked by the mansa from the conquering farin or family members. The only real requirement was that the mansa knew he could trust this individual to safeguard imperial interests.

Duties of the farba included reporting on the activities of the territory, collecting taxes and ensuring the native administration didn't contradict orders from Niani. The farba could also take power away from the native administration if required and raise an army in the area for defence or putting down rebellions.

The post of a farba was very prestigious, and his descendants could inherit it with the mansa's approval. The mansa could also replace a farba if he got out of control, as in the case of Diafunu.

Economy
In 1307, Mansa Musa came to the throne after a series of civil wars and ruled for thirty years. During the peak of the kingdom, Mali was extremely wealthy. This was due to the tax on trade in and out of the empire, along with all the gold Mansa Musa had. He had so much gold that during his hajj to Mecca, the Mansa passed out gold to all the poor along the way. This led to inflation throughout the kingdom. Mansa Musa also ran out of gold on the hajj to Mecca but was not concerned because he knew he had enough gold back in Mali to pay back everyone he owed money to.
Trade was a significant factor to the rise and success of Mali. Mali flourished especially when Timbuktu came under Mansa Musa's control. Timbuktu was a place of trade, entertainment, and education. The city's water supply was a leading cause to its successes in trade. Mansa Musa placed a heavy tax on all objects that went through Timbuktu. Although this time in the kingdom was prosperous, Mali's wealth and power soon declined.
Mali was thriving for a long time, but like other west African kingdoms, Mali began to fall. Constant civil war between leaders led to a weakened state. These conflicts also interrupted trade. This is one of the main factors to the fall of the kingdom. Trade was Mali's form of income, and wealth. With trade being disrupted by wars, there was no way for the economy to continue to prosper. As a result of this the empire fell.

The Mali Empire flourished because of its trade above all else. It contained three immense gold mines within its borders unlike the Ghana Empire, which was only a transit point for gold. The empire taxed every ounce of gold, copper and salt that entered its borders. By the beginning of the 14th century, Mali was the source of almost half the Old World's gold exported from mines in Bambuk, Boure and Galam. Gold mines in Boure, which is located in present-day Guinea, were discovered sometime near the end of the 12th century.

There was no standard currency throughout the realm, but several forms were prominent by region. The Sahelian and Saharan towns of the Mali Empire were organised as both staging posts in the long-distance caravan trade and trading centres for the various West African products. At Taghaza, for example, salt was exchanged; at Takedda, copper. Ibn Battuta observed the employment of servants in both towns. During most of his journey, Ibn Battuta travelled with a retinue that included servants, most of whom carried goods for trade. On the return from Takedda to Morocco, his caravan transported 600 female servants, suggesting that indentured servitude was a substantial part of the commercial activity of the empire.

Gold

Mali's wealth in gold did not primarily come from direct rule of gold-producing regions, but rather from tribute and trade with the regions where gold was found. Gold nuggets were the exclusive property of the mansa and were illegal to trade within his borders. All gold was immediately handed over to the imperial treasury in return for an equal value of gold dust. Gold dust had been weighed and bagged for use at least since the time of the Ghana Empire. Mali borrowed the practice to stem inflation of the substance, since it was so prominent in the region. The most common measure for gold within the realm was the ambiguous mithqal (4.5 grams of gold). This term was used interchangeably with dinar, though it is unclear if coined currency was used in the empire. Gold dust was used all over the empire, but was not valued equally in all regions.

Salt 

The next great unit of exchange in the Mali Empire was salt. Salt was as valuable, if not more valuable, than gold in sub-Saharan Africa. It was cut into pieces and spent on goods with close to equal buying power throughout the empire. While it was as good as gold in the north, it was even better in the south. The people of the south needed salt for their diet, but it was extremely rare. The northern region on the other hand had no shortage of salt. Every year merchants entered Mali via Oualata with camel loads of salt to sell in Niani. According to Ibn Battuta who visited Mali in the mid-14th century, one camel load of salt sold at Walata for 8–10 mithqals of gold, but in Mali proper it realised 20–30 ducats and sometimes even 40. One particular source of salt in the Mali Empire was salt-mining sites located in Taghaza. Ibn Battuta had written that in Taghaza there were no trees and there is only sand and the salt mines. Nobody lived in the area except the Musafa servants who worked to dig the salts and lived on dates imported from Sijilmasa and the Dar'a valley, camel meat and millet imported from the Sudan. The buildings were constructed from slabs of salt and roofed with camel skins. The salt was dug from the ground and cut into thick slabs, two of which were loaded onto each camel where they would be taken south across the desert to Oualata and sold. The value of the salt was chiefly determined by the transport costs. Ibn Battuta mentions that the value of salt increased fourfold when transported between Oualata and the Malian capital.

Copper 
Copper was also a valued commodity in imperial Mali. According to the records of Ibn Battuta, copper which traded in bars was mined from Takedda in the north and traded in the south for gold. Contemporary sources claim 60 copper bars traded for 100 dinars of gold.

Military

The number and frequency of conquests in the late 13th century and throughout the 14th century indicate the Kolonkan mansas inherited and/or developed a capable military. Sundjata is credited with at least the initial organisation of the Manding military. However, it went through radical changes before reaching the legendary proportions proclaimed by its subjects. As a result of steady tax revenue and stable government beginning in the last quarter of the 13th century, the Mali Empire was able to project its power throughout its own extensive domain and beyond. It had a well-organised army with an elite corps of horsemen and many foot soldiers in each battalion. An army was required to guard the borders to protect its flourishing trade. Evidence of cavalry in terracotta figures suggest the empire's prosperous economy as horses are not indigenous to Africa.

Strength

The Mali Empire maintained a semi-professional, full-time army in order to defend its borders. The entire nation was mobilised, with each clan obligated to provide a quota of fighting-age men. These men had to be of the horon (freemen) caste and appear with their own arms. Historians who lived during the height and decline of the Mali Empire consistently record its standing army peaking at 100,000, with 10,000 of that number being made up of cavalry. With the help of the river clans, this army could be deployed throughout the realm on short notice. Numerous sources attest that the inland waterways of West Africa saw extensive use of war canoes and vessels used for war transport where permitted by the environment. Most West African canoes were of single-log construction, carved and dug out from one massive tree trunk.

Order of battle 

The army of the Mali Empire during the 14th century was divided into northern and southern commands led by the Farim-Soura and Sankar-Zouma, respectively. Both of these men were part of Mali's warrior elite known as the ton-ta-jon-ta-ni-woro ("sixteen carriers of quivers"). Each representative or ton-tigi ("quiver-master") provided counsel to the mansa at the Gbara, but only these two ton-tigi held such wide-ranging power.

The ton-tigi belonged to an elite force of cavalry commanders called the farari ("brave men"). Each individual farariya ("brave") had a number of infantry officers beneath them called kèlè-koun or dùùkùnàsi. A kèlè-koun led free troops into battle alongside a farima ("brave man") during campaign. A dùùkùnàsi performed the same function except with slave troops called sofa ("guardian of the horse") and under the command of a farimba ("great brave man"). The farimba operated from a garrison with an almost entirely slave force, while a farima functioned on field with virtually all freemen.

Equipment 

The army of the Mali Empire used of a wide variety of weapons depending largely on where the troops originated. Only sofa were equipped by the state, using bows and poisoned arrows. Free warriors from the north (Mandekalu or otherwise) were usually equipped with large reed or animal hide shields and a stabbing spear that was called a tamba. Free warriors from the south came armed with bows and poisonous arrows. The bow figured prominently in Mandinka warfare and was a symbol of military force throughout the culture. Bowmen formed a large portion of the field army as well as the garrison. Three bowmen supporting one spearman was the ratio in Kaabu and the Gambia by the mid-16th century. Equipped with two quivers and a knife fastened to the back of their arm, Mandinka bowmen used barbed, iron-tipped arrows that were usually poisoned. They also used flaming arrows for siege warfare. While spears and bows were the mainstay of the infantry, swords and lances of local or foreign manufacture were the choice weapons of the cavalry. Ibn Battuta comments on festival demonstrations of swordplay before the mansa by his retainers including the royal interpreter. Another common weapon of Mandekalu warriors was the poison javelin used in skirmishes. Imperial Mali's horsemen also used iron helmet and mail armour for defence as well as shields similar to those of the infantry.

Society and culture

Architecture

Imperial Malian architecture was characterised by Sudano-Sahelian architecture with a Malian substyle, which is exemplified by the Great Mosque of Djenne. This style is characterised by the use of mudbricks and an adobe plaster, with large wooden-log support beams that jut out from the wall face for large buildings such as mosques or palaces. Many houses were built by hand and during the hot weather some houses would melt so they had to be very secure

The dating of the original Great Mosque's construction is obscure (the current structure, built under French Colonial Rule, dates from 1907). The earliest document mentioning the mosque is Abd al-Sadi's Tarikh al-Sudan, which gives the early history, presumably from the oral tradition as it existed in the mid seventeenth century. The tarikh states that a Sultan Kunburu became a Muslim and had his palace pulled down and the site turned into a mosque; he then built another palace for himself near the mosque on the east side.

The Sudano-Sahelian influence was particularly widely incorporated during the rule of Mansa Musa I, who constructed many architectural projects, including the Great Mosque of Gao and Royal Palace in Timbuktu, which was built with the assistance of Ishaak al-Tuedjin, an architect brought by Musa from his pilgrimage to Mecca.

== See also ==
African empires
Gbara
Keita Dynasty
Kouroukan Fouga
Kouyate family
Mansa
Military history of the Mali Empire
Segou Empire
Songhai Empire
List of Sunni Muslim dynasties
Bambuk territory

Footnotes

References

Primary sources

, translated in 
, translated in 
, translated in 
 .
, translated in 
, translated in

Other sources

 

 

 (on the Kings of Mali)

 First published in 1981 by Cambridge University Press,

Further reading

External links

African Kingdoms Mali
Metropolitan Museum – Empires of the Western Sudan: Mali Empire
The Story of Africa: Mali – BBC World Service
Ibn Battuta: Travels in Asia and Africa 1325–1354 – excerpts from H. A. R. Gibb's translation

 
Countries in medieval Africa
Sahelian kingdoms
Former empires in Africa
States and territories established in the 1230s
13th-century establishments in Africa
States and territories disestablished in 1670
1670 disestablishments in Africa